Serlon de Burci was a Norman of the eleventh century. After the Norman conquest of England, he became a feudal baron and major landowner in south-west England. His feudal barony had as its caput the manor of Blagdon in Somerset. He is recorded in the Domesday Survey of 1086.

He is thought to have originated in Burcy, Calvados.

Family
His daughter and heiress Geva married twice, her second husband being William de Falaise. Robert FitzMartin was her son by her first marriage to Martin de Turribus.

Notes

Anglo-Normans
11th-century Normans
11th-century English landowners